Maranta leuconeura, also known as prayer plant, is a species of flowering plant in the family Marantaceae, native to the Brazilian tropical forests.

Description
The specific epithet leuconeura means "white-veined", referring to the leaves. The leaves have a habit of lying flat during the day, and folding in an erect position at night as if in prayer for evening vespers, hence the common name "prayer plant". This behaviour is an example of a diurnal rhythm.

Small, white flowers appear during the growing season, although this is rarely observed in houseplants and the flowers are not of particular value in comparison to the attractive foliage. The broad leaves of the plant are oval, two-color, greenish and fairly shiny. There are spots on both sides of the leaf medium, the color of which varies depending on the variety. The spots may be light green, green, brownish or dark gray. Medium color also varies by variety. The undersides of the leaves are variable, ranging from a light green, common in M. leuconeura var. kerchoveana, to a deep red, common in M. leuconeura var. erythroneura. Roots are shallow.

Cultivation

As a plant that is native to rainforests, Maranta prefers bright indirect sunlight, high humidity, and well-drained soil that has a high humus content. Acidic, clay or loam soils are tolerable.

Direct sunlight should be avoided, as well as standing water. At daytime the ideal temperature is 21–27 °C and at night 16–21 °C; the night temperature should not be lower than 15 °C. Higher temperatures also require higher humidity, for example, just spraying.

During the growing season, spring and summer, Maranta houseplants require moist soil and fertilization every month. Slightly drier soils and reduced fertilizer application are recommended for the remainder of the year. In warmer climates, at USDA Zones 10b-11, it can be grown as groundcover in moist, shady areas.

Propagation
Spacing between plants should be between 60 and 90 cm (24–36 in) Propagation is achieved via division and cuttings. Cuttings, 10 cm in length with 3–4 leaves, should be taken in the spring. Bottom heat can be applied to the cuttings to promote rooting. Propagation by seed is possible although is less common. Seed germination is recommended at 13–18 °C (55–64 °F). Maranta leuconeura can also be propagated in vitro.

Cultivars
Numerous cultivars have been produced.

Varieties
The following  naturally occurring varieties (distinguishable from artificially selected cultivars) have gained the Royal Horticultural Society's Award of Garden Merit:-

Maranta leuconeura var. kerchoveana (rabbit's foot), dark blotches between the leaf veins
Maranta leuconeura var. erythroneura (herringbone plant); strong red veining on dark green leaves

Common uses
M. leuconeura can be grown in planters, hanging baskets, mass planting, and as an edging plant. This plant is frequently used in shopping malls.

Chemistry
Rosmarinic acid can be found in plants in the family Marantaceae such as Maranta leuconeura.

Diseases
Maranta usually experiences minimal insect pest pressure, however, spider mites and mealybugs can be of concern. Leaf spot and cucumber mosaic virus are diseases that can occur. Root rot can occur in poorly drained soils.

See also
Fishbone prayer plant

References

Flora of Brazil
leuconeura
House plants